The 366th Guards Motor Rifle Regiment was a motor rifle unit of the Soviet Army and the United Armed Forces of the Commonwealth of Independent States.

Lineage 

 3rd Turkestan Cavalry Division
8th Cavalry Corps
14th Guards Cavalry Division, 7th Guards Cavalry Corps
 98th Guards Mechanized Regiment
 366th Guards Motor Rifle Regiment

Cold War 
On 17 November 1964, the new name of the 98th Guards Mechanized Regiment became 366th Guards Motorized Rifle Mozyr Red Banner Order of Suvorov Regiment. In 1985, the regiment was relocated from Şəmkir to Stepanakert, the administrative center of the Nagorno-Karabakh Autonomous Region. The military town of the regiment was located in the upper part of the city near the road connecting it with the city of Shusha.

Before the redeployment of the regiment, which was equipped with vehicles such as BMPs, there were no large military units on the territory of the NKAO. The reasons for the redeployment was never revealed. According to many Azerbaijani sources, this happened as a result of secret negotiations between high-ranking Armenian nationalists with the leadership of the Transcaucasian Military District. In 1988, all units of the 23rd Guards Motor Rifle Division except the 366th Regiment were based at Kirovabad (now Ganja, Azerbaijan).

Karabakh War and Khojaly Massacre 
In the second half of 1987, acute interethnic tensions arose in the NKAO. In February 1988, the crisis in the region intensified after the Sumgait pogrom. The personnel of the regiment to show signs of demoralization due to the factors constant attacks on military personnel with the aim of seizing weapons, a lack of proper food supply, understaffing and pressure coming from the local population. The understaffing of the personnel, which affected the impossibility of ensuring reliable protection of the regiment's facilities. "Officers and soldiers didn’t receive money for months, they didn’t eat bread for weeks, they ate only crackers from the NZ (emergency reserve)". In such conditions, by the end of 1991, many officers of the regiment began receiving offers to participate in hostilities on a paid basis, on the side of the Armenian armed formations. On December 25, 1991, with the Dissolution of the Soviet Union, the regiment formally became part of the CIS Joint Armed Forces. At this point, officers of the regiment had begun to offer assistance to the Armenian population, while the units based in Ganja sided with the Azeri population. A factor in this change in policy was the fact that 50 of the remaining 350 personnel of the regiment were Armenians, including the commander of the 2nd Battalion, Major Seyran Ohanyan. Of particular use to the Armenian Army was the regimental tank company's ten tanks.

Following an attack on the regiment on 23 February, the regiment took part in the mass murder of several hundreds of Azerbaijani civilians in the town of Khojaly on 26 February. The event, known today as the Khojaly massacre, was the largest single massacre throughout the entire Nagorno-Karabakh conflict, though disputed by Czech journalist Dana Mazalová, who recalled what Azeri journalist Chingiz Mustafayev told her about the massacre, claiming Azeri forces committed a massacre of Meskhetian Turks and placed the bodies there to disrupt a Commission on Security and Cooperation in Europe meeting for the conflict a month later. Mazalová added that she spoke to Azeri President Ayaz Mutalibov about the incident and said he felt Azeri forces may have committed this massacre to depose him from his presidency. Krasnaya Zvezda reported that personnel of the 366th took part in "military operations" in the town "despite categorical orders of the command of the military district" and that many in the regiment who were selectively searched had "large amounts of money on them, including foreign currency". Russian authorities to date deny the involvement of the regiment in the atrocities at Khojaly. Following the massacre, the leadership of the CIS Joint Armed Forces made the decision to evacuate the regiment from Stepanakert to Vaziani in the territory of Georgia. The withdrawal of the regiment began on March 1, accompanied by battles with Armenian volunteer formations. 10 days later, the regiment was disbanded in Vaziani.

Commanders 

 Colonel Alexander Kolyvanov (1988-1990)
 Lieutenant Colonel Yuri Zarvigorov (1990-1992)

Citations

Sources
 

Regiments of the Soviet Union
Infantry units and formations of the Soviet Union
Military units and formations established in 1964
Military units and formations disestablished in 1992
Nagorno-Karabakh conflict
Khojaly Massacre
Commonwealth of Independent States